"Be My Little Baby Bumble Bee" is a popular song. The music was written by Henry I. Marshall and the lyrics by Stanley Murphy. The song was published in 1912, and appeared in the 1912 play A Winsome Widow.

The song has since become a standard, recorded by many artists. One of the most popular early recordings was by Ada Jones and Billy Murray who recorded it as a duet on July 8, 1912 for Victor Records (catalog 17152 B).

Doris Day and Russell Arms performed the song in the 1953 film By the Light of the Silvery Moon.

Noteworthy recordings
 Ada Jones and Billy Murray (1912)
 Ada Jones and Walter Van Brunt (1912)
 Gordon MacRae and June Huttonon the album Songs from 'By the Light of the Silvery Moon'... (1953).
 Doris Day on the album By the Light of the Silvery Moon (1953)

References

1912 songs
Male–female vocal duets